Taisiia-Oksana Vitaliyivna Shchuruk (born 20 November 1998) is a Ukrainian actress who primarily known for her role Katia Shchaslyva in teen drama series Early Swallows and Taisiia in reality television series Kiev Day and Night.

Early life and education
Perceived as non-Eastern Slavic naming customs, her full name is Taisiia-Oksana Vitaliyivna Shchuruk. The name "Taisiia" and "Oksana" was frequently used by her father and godfather, then her relatives adapted as compound name. Her brother also proposed masculine name like Lev-Zoryan. 

Shchuruk stated that she had suffered from blindness and use glasses during high-school years. She coveted to be an actress at younger age. In order to do so, Taisiia-Oksana began engaging with modelling, dancing and acting in her class. She graduated in 2019 and entered acting department of I.K.Karpenko in Kyiv National University.

Career
Shchuruk began her career in 2015 television show Real Mystic, as a cameo role, and in the same year, she took a role in Ukrainian medical melodrama Clinic. She rolled for one episode in Clinic. Later, she has a successful role in 2016 reality television show Kiev Day and Night, partaking her real name. In this series, she encounters adolescence problem and family conflict. She led the series up to third season, and quit the series of her willingness, began pursuing other television shows. Shchuruk then focused in films such as Life on the Edge and medical drama series Doctor Kovalchuk in 2018. In that year, she rolled in the psychological horror series Morena with character of Anya. In this series, Anya finds herself in mystical place called Carpathians and embarks adventurous life for survival. She became popular in the teen drama series Early Swallows, dealing with young adolescent who overcome with the threatening. Her role has been praised by BBC News and the series itself earned positive reviews for its awareness of sexual harassment, bullying, and suicide. Katia Shchaslyva finds herself with unfavorable life situation and her family become distressed. She began managing herself and left her family, where she finally finds a boy and begin a new life.

Filmography

References

Ukrainian film actresses
Ukrainian television actresses
1998 births
Living people
21st-century Ukrainian actresses